Joachim Koester (born 1962) is a conceptual artist. He works principally in still photography and video. Hal Foster, writing in Artforum, has characterized his work as being "along the borders between documentary and fiction." 

Over the last fifteen years, his work has been exhibited internationally, in Europe, North America, and Africa. Koester was a 2008 finalist for the Hugo Boss Prize.

Koester is a graduate of the Royal Danish Academy of Art in Copenhagen, where he was born.

References

External links
 Artforum commentary
 Artpace exhibition
 Moderna exhibition
 Kunsthalle exhibition
 Artnews listing of exhibitions and collections

Danish conceptual artists
Danish photographers
Danish video artists
Artists from Copenhagen
Royal Danish Academy of Fine Arts alumni
1962 births
Living people